Aleksandar Stijović (born 27 January 1981) is a Montenegrin forestry engineer and politician. He serves as Minister of Agriculture, Forestry and Water Management in the Government of Montenegro and the cabinet of Zdravko Krivokapić .

Biography 
Stijović was born in SR Serbia in 1981. Aleksandar Stijović graduated from a forestry high school in Berane, then enrolled at the Faculty of Forestry, University of Belgrade, where he graduated with a bachelor's degree and later earned a master's degree with a thesis “Use of forest biomass in mountainous conditions of Montenegro".

Professional career
As a chief engineer, he was employed at the Institute of Forestry of Montenegro from 2014 to 2018. For over eight years he was engaged in the Institute of Forestry of Montenegro on the project as an expert on forest health. He was engaged in many other projects lasting from several months to a year or more in important departments from the Delegation of the European Union in Podgorica through the National Parks of Montenegro, the International Center for Sustainable Development of Energy, Water and Environment, the European Bank for Rural Development, World Bank etc.

Political career
On 5 November 2020, the prime minister-designate of Montenegro, Zdravko Krivokapić, appointed him a candidate for the Minister of Agriculture, Forestry and Water Management in the new Government of Montenegro. He serves as minister in Krivokapić Cabinet , when he was officially appointed by the parliament.

References 

Living people
1981 births
People from Berane
Montenegrin politicians
Agriculture ministers of Montenegro
Forestry ministers of Montenegro
Water ministers of Montenegro
University of Belgrade Faculty of Forestry alumni
Serbs of Montenegro
Forestry engineers
Montenegrin people of Serbian descent